Patricia Lynch is an American lobbyist from the State of New York. She is the founder and president of Patricia Lynch Associates, Inc. (PLA/NY), a New York government relations and media firm.

Before forming PLA/NY, Lynch worked for Senate Democrats and members of Congress. From there, she became the communications director for the office of the Speaker of the Assembly, Sheldon Silver.

PLA/NY began in 2001 as a two-person start-up in Albany and became a multinational firm. As of 2013, Lynch's clients included multinational corporations, real estate companies, gaming interests, educational interests, health care groups, and religious institutions. Since starting PLA/NY, Lynch has influenced New York State policy decisions, including the defeat of former Governor David Paterson’s proposed “soda tax”, the passage of the SUNY 2020 plan, charter school funding and expansion, and the Tappan Zee Bridge replacement project. She has been named in Crain’s New York's list of the “50 Most Powerful Women in NY”, City and State’s “Top 25 Women of Public and Civic Mind”, and Campaign and Elections Magazine’s “100 Most Influential New Yorkers”.
 
In 2009, Lynch, along with her team, began working in the country of Panama to bring major productions to that region. These included the Sports Illustrated Swimsuit Edition/Panama section,  and Major League Baseball's first return to Panama since 1947.  Partnering with Mariano Rivera, Lynch promoted the two games between the Florida Marlins and the New York Yankees in March 2014.

In December 2010, PLA/NY was fined $500,000 by the State of New York and was subjected to a five-year partial lobbying ban following allegations of improper attempts to influence the Comptroller's Office. Prior to 2013, the Internal Revenue Service (IRS) filed a $720,000 tax lien against PLA/NY. The IRS filed a $580,666 tax lien against PLA/NY in August 2010 due to unpaid federal payroll taxes. An additional tax lien for $192,369 was filed against PLA/NY by the IRS in 2013. 

In 2016, federal prosecutors alleged that former Assembly Speaker Sheldon Silver had extramarital affairs with two women during his Assembly tenure. According to a federal judge, the two women allegedly "'exploited'" their relationships with Silver "'for personal gain'". Sources identified Lynch as one of the two women.

A lifelong resident of New York, Lynch was raised in a working-class neighborhood in Utica, New York.

References

Year of birth missing (living people)
Living people
American lobbyists
Businesspeople from Utica, New York
People from Chappaqua, New York